Urospora is a genus of green algae in the family Ulotrichaceae. In 2022, a member of genus Urospora was shown to be a photobiont partner for a crustose seashore lichen in the family Verrucariaceae. This is the first time that a member of this genus, or of the order Ulotrichales, has been recorded as a photobiont.

References

Further reading
Leliaert, F., Rueness, J., Boedeker, C., Maggs,C.A., Cocquyt,E., Verbruggen, H. and de Clerck, O. 2009. Systematics of the marine microfilamentous green algae Uronema curvatum and Urospora microscopia (Chlorophyta). Eur. J. Phycol. 44: 487 -496.

External links

Ulvophyceae genera
Ulotrichaceae